Sandy is a city in the Salt Lake City metropolitan area, located in Salt Lake County, Utah, United States. The population of Sandy was 87,461 at the 2010 census, making it the sixth-largest city in Utah. The population is currently estimated to be about 96,380 according to the July 1, 2019 United States Census estimates.

Sandy is home to the Shops at South Town shopping mall; the Jordan Commons entertainment, office and dining complex; and the Mountain America Exposition Center. It is also the location of the soccer-specific America First Field (formerly known as Rio Tinto Stadium), which hosts Real Salt Lake and Utah Royals FC home games, and opened on October 8, 2008.

The city is currently developing a walkable and transit-oriented city center called The Cairns. A formal master plan was adopted in January 2017 to accommodate regional growth and outlines developments and related guidelines through the next 25 years, while dividing the city center into distinct villages. The plan emphasizes sustainable living, walkability, human-scaled architecture, environmentally-friendly design, and nature-inspired design while managing population growth and its related challenges.

History

Early settlements 
The area was first used by nomadic bands of Paiute, Shoshone, and Bannock Indians who roamed along the base of the mountains as they travelled from their winter home at Utah Lake to their summer fishing grounds at Bear Lake.

Permanent settlers first moved into Sandy during the 1860s and 1870s because of the availability of land in the less crowded southern end of the Salt Lake Valley. The original plat was essentially one square mile, situated on an alluvial terrace running north and south along the eastern edge of the Jordan River drainage system and paralleling the mountain range.

The origin of its name has not been established with any certainty. Perhaps most widely believed is that Brigham Young named Sandy for its thirsty soil, but there is no historical evidence for this. Another theory is that the name came from a legendary and colorful Scotsman, Alexander "Sandy" Kinghorn, the engineer who ran the first train line to this end of the Salt Lake Valley. Though this seems bolstered by the original name (Sandy Station or Sandy's Station), historians consider it unlikely in view of the short period between the start of the train service and the first instances of the name.

In 1863, there were only four homes between Union (7200 South) and Dunyon (Point of the Mountain): the Thayne homestead at 6600 South and 800 East, one in Crescent, one at Dunyon, and a fourth outside present-day Sandy boundaries altogether. Within a few years, Thomas Allsop, a Yorkshire farmer who had immigrated to Utah in 1853, owned almost half of present-day Sandy from County Road to Fourth East along Alta Road to Lindell Parkway. LeGrand Young owned the land between Fourth East and State Street.

Farmers willing to try their hand at the thirsty soil that inspired Sandy's name took up land along State Street, which stretched from downtown Salt Lake City to Point of the Mountain. But it was mining that shaped Sandy's first four decades. When silver mining began in Little Cottonwood Canyon, entrepreneurs recognized Sandy's value as a supply station; soon its main street was lined with hotels, saloons, and brothels serving miners ready to spend their newly earned wages. Three major smelters were located in Sandy. They were the Flagstaff, the Mingo, and the Saturn. These made Sandy the territory's most significant smelting center for a number of years.

The railroad was also significant in determining the course of Sandy's history. Built in 1873, the railroad connected Sandy to Salt Lake City and facilitated the transportation of ore and other products both in and out of the area. A streetcar line in 1907 facilitated the transportation of locals to jobs in Salt Lake City; and the automobile later continued to serve that function.

Incorporation
Sandy was incorporated in 1893, largely as part of an effort to combat what Mormon inhabitants considered "unsavory" elements in the town. Due to its mine-based beginnings, Sandy saw some modest growth. After incorporation, it was almost as if Sandy had redefined itself. Gone were the large numbers of single, transient men. By 1900, there was only a handful of saloons and hotels, and Sandy began to more closely resemble other rural Utah towns — a place where everyone knew everyone else. Church, farming, business, and family formed the focus of the inhabitants' world.

In the late 1960s, however, this rural town dramatically changed course with its second boom. It had always been assumed by local leaders and citizens that Sandy would grow outward from its logical and historic center—the nexus of Main and Center streets. However, population growth overwhelmed the physical center as neighborhoods spread out in every direction over the land.

During the 1970s, pocket communities took shape, providing the services, schools, and shopping traditionally offered by a city. Annexation issues became prominent as Salt Lake County and Sandy vied for control over land and resources. Sandy became a collection of small local communities identified by a youthful, family-oriented population. Although it was initially perceived as a bedroom community, and often still is, it has since developed a thriving commercial center along State Street and other various arterial roads.

The Cairns 

In 2014, the Sandy City government revealed blueprints to redevelop 1,100 acres of Sandy's downtown area into a new resort-style city center over the next 25 years, adding high-rise multi-family residential buildings and office towers, while also renovating the Shops at South Town shopping mall. The plans will also add new multi-use trails, the new Hale Center Theatre, and other amenities. The city center project is named The Cairns, with the project stretching between 9000 South and 11400 South, and Interstate 15 to the TRAX Blue Line. The project includes the American First Field and the Mountain America Exposition Center.

The project divides the city center into distinct urban villages; the areas currently under development include:
 Central Village – An office park and retail development along State Street;
 South Village – The largest village, home to City Hall, the Hale Center Theatre, the Shops at South Town, and retail and office space; and
 East Village – A transit-oriented development focused around Sandy Civic Center TRAX light rail station, including retail, office, and multi-family residential.
The master plan also includes study areas for future development and single-use areas that are unlikely to change.

Progress 
As of February 2017, the first phase of the Shops at South Town redevelopment is complete and the Central Village office towers (including a new InContact headquarters), the Hale Center Theatre, and the Park at City Center residential project are near completion. The East Village transit-oriented development is nearly halfway complete, with residential projects near completion and mixed-use projects planned for a late 2017 or early 2018 groundbreaking. Transit enhancements are planned to connect the TRAX station to the South Jordan FrontRunner station, and create a link between the active villages, by way of rubber-tire bus, trolleybus, or tram. This route has been studied and is currently under planning.

Geography and climate

The major residential region of eastern Sandy sits on the slopes of the Wasatch Range while the western section lies at the bottom of the valley. Interstate 15 and State Street (US-89) run through the western portions of the city, while the Jordan River forms part of the western border with West Jordan and South Jordan.

Climate

Under the Köppen climate classification, Sandy has a humid subtropical climate (Cfa) or a humid continental climate (Dfa) depending on which variant of the system is used.

Demographics

According to estimates from the U.S. Census Bureau, as of 2017, there were 96,145 people in Sandy. The racial makeup of the county was 84.6% non-Hispanic White, 0.7% Black, 0.4% Native American, 3.0% Asian, 0.7 Pacific Islander, and 2.1% from two or more races. 8.9% of the population were Hispanic or Latino of any race.

The city population remains the sixth largest in Utah , there were 87,418 people, 28,296 households, and 22,553 families residing in the city.  The race and ethnicity compositions of the city were 90.0% White, 3.0% Asian, 0.7% Black, 0.6% Pacific Islander, 0.5% Native American, 2.6% from other races, and 2.5% from two or more races. Hispanic or Latino of any race were 7.4% of the population.

In the city, the population was spread out, with 31.3% at age of 19 and under, 13.3% from 20 to 29, 19.2% from 29 to 44, 26.9% from 45 to 64, and 9.3% who were 65 years of age or older. The median age was 29 years. For every 100 females, there were 99.3 males. For every 100 females age 18 and over, there were 96.8 males. There were 28,296 households, out of which 38.0% had children under the age of 18 living with them, 66.1% were married couples living together, 9.5% had a female householder with no husband present, and 20.3% were non-families. 15.8% of all households were made up of individuals, and 5.9% had someone living alone who was 65 years of age or older. The average household size was 3.08 and the average family size was 3.45.

The median income for a household in the city was $76,904, and the median income for a family was $84,770. Full-time year-around male workers had a median income of $59,108 versus $40,506 for female workers. The per capita income for the city was $30,952, 7.8% of the population and 6.1% of families were below the poverty line. Of the total population, 11.0% of those under the age 18 and 4.3% of those 65 and older were living below the poverty line.

Education

Jordan School District was the primary school district in Sandy until 2009. In 2007, citizens voted to split Jordan School District to create 2 separate school districts - Jordan School District and the newly created Canyons School District.  The Canyons School District is now the primary school district located in Sandy. It began operation at the beginning of the 2009–10 school year.

Sandy has 18 elementary schools (Alta View, Altara, Bell View, Brookwood, Crescent, East Sandy, Edgemont, Granite, Lone Peak, Oakdale, Park Lane, Peruvian Park, Quail Hollow, Sandy, Silver Mesa, Sprucewood, Sunrise, Willow Canyon), six middle schools (Albion, Crescent View, Eastmont, Indian Hills, Mount Jordan, Union), five high schools (Corner Canyon, Jordan, Hillcrest, Brighton, and Alta), one technical school (Canyons Technical Education Center—CTEC), and one alternative high school (Southpointe). The Blessed Sacrament School is a private Catholic elementary school.

Sandy is home to a continuing education campus for non-traditional students at the University of Utah, opened in 2015.

Sports
Sandy is home to Real Salt Lake, a Major League Soccer team established in 2004 that plays at the American First Field on the city's west side.

Transportation

Roadways 
The city's roads are located on the same grid system as the rest of Salt Lake County.
I-15 runs down the western side of Sandy, with three exits (at 9000 South, 10600 South and 11400 South) located in the city. An additional ramp was built in early 2017 to connect the 10600 South northbound off-ramp to Monroe Street. U.S. Route 89 runs parallel to I-15 through the city as State Street, and Utah State Route 209 runs east/west, terminating within the Wasatch Range at Alta Ski Resort.

Bus 
The Utah Transit Authority (UTA) operates a bus system that reaches into the city (including two normal routes, three FLEX routes, and one ski service route). Bus routes serve nearby light rail stations, commercial districts (including the Shops at South Town and the State Street commercial district), office parks, and government offices. The ski bus route operates from Historic Sandy TRAX station to Alta Ski Area and Snowbird and runs seasonally.

Sandy and UTA are currently developing a circulator bus or trolley route between Sandy Civic Center TRAX station and South Jordan FrontRunner station. The route, not yet in service, will have the potential to convert into a streetcar route in the distant future. A feasibility study was conducted by UTA in 2015, outlining the need for a circulator route, which was established into Sandy's long-term city center plan in January 2017. The route will incorporate a dedicated transit guideway on 10200 S over or under Interstate 15.

Rail 
UTA's TRAX light rail system operates in Sandy. The city is home to four light rail stations: Historic Sandy at 9000 South; Sandy Expo, an infill station at 9375 South, serving the Mountain America Exposition Center and America First Field; Sandy Civic Center at 10000 South, serving the city center and nearby transit-oriented developments; and Crescent View at 11400 South. All of Sandy's light rail stations are on the Blue Line, terminating at Salt Lake Central Station to the north and Draper Town Center to the south.

Notable people
 Ryon Bingham - professional football player
 John Brzenk - professional arm-wrestler
 William T. Fairbourn - Marine Corps Major General
 Jim Fullington - professional wrestler
 Bonnie Gritton - pianist and professor
 Derek Hough - professional dancer
 Julianne Hough - professional dancer
 DaMarques Johnson - mixed martial artist
 Sean O'Connell - mixed martial artist 
 Doug Jolley - professional American football player
 Megan Joy - finalist on American Idol (season 8)
 Karl Meltzer - ultra-marathon runner, 2006 North-American ultra-runner of the year by UltraRunning Magazine
 Craig Richard Nelson - actor and director
 Grant H. Palmer - historian and author
 Jamie Pierre - professional freeskier
 Dalton Schultz, professional football player
 Apa Sherpa - co-record holder for reaching the summit of Mt. Everest (21 times)
 Dick Simon - race car driver
 John Earle Sullivan - photojournalist during the January 6 United States Capitol attack
 Mike Weir - professional golfer
 Mary Elizabeth Winstead - actress
 Brian David Mitchell and Wanda Elaine Barzee, kidnappers of Elizabeth Smart
 Elizabeth Smart, kidnapping victim and activist

In the media

 The 1992 TV movie Deliver Them From Evil: The Taking of Alta View is based on the Alta View Hospital hostage incident that took place in Sandy in 1991.
 Elizabeth Smart was discovered walking down the street with her captors in Sandy nine months after being abducted from her home, an event dramatized in the CBS movie The Elizabeth Smart Story.
 The fictional HBO drama Big Love is set in Sandy.

Local media
 Sandy City Journal, tabloid-style newspaper covering local government, schools, sports, and features.

Sister cities
Sandy has two official sister cities as recognized by Sister Cities International.

See also
Sandy, Utah attack

References

External links

 
Wasatch Front
Cities in Utah
Cities in Salt Lake County, Utah
Populated places established in 1873
Salt Lake City metropolitan area
1873 establishments in Utah Territory